The 2018 North Queensland Cowboys season was the 24th in the club's history. Coached by Paul Green and co-captained by Johnathan Thurston and Matthew Scott, they competed in the NRL's 2018 Telstra Premiership. The team finished the regular season in 13th position and did not qualify for the finals.

Season summary

Milestones
 Round 1: Johnathan Thurston played his 300th NRL game.
 Round 1: Johnathan Thurston played his 271st game for the club, becoming the Cowboys' most capped player.
 Round 1: Jordan McLean made his debut for the club.
 Round 2: Antonio Winterstein played his 200th NRL game.
 Round 2: Jordan McLean scored his first try for the club.
 Round 7: Ethan Lowe played his 100th NRL game for the club.
 Round 11: Jason Taumalolo played his 150th NRL game for the club.
 Round 11: Francis Molo made his debut for the club.
 Round 13: Mitchell Dunn made his NRL debut.
 Round 13: Jake Granville played his 100th NRL game.
 Round 13: Enari Tuala scored his first NRL try.
 Round 16: Gavin Cooper played his 200th NRL game for the club.
 Round 19: Jake Clifford made his NRL debut.
 Round 20: The club won their 250th game.
 Round 24: Jake Granville played his 100th NRL game for the club.
 Round 24: Matthew Scott played his 250th game for the club.
 Round 25: Gavin Cooper scored in his 9th consecutive game, breaking the record set by Frank Burge in 1918 for most consecutive try scoring games by a forward.

Squad

Squad movement

Gains

Losses

Re-signings

Ladder

Fixtures

Pre-season

Regular season

Statistics

Representatives
The following players have played a representative match in 2018.

Honours

League
Dally M Lock of the Year: Jason Taumalolo
Rugby League Players Association Halfback of the Year: Johnathan Thurston
Rugby League Players Association Lock of the Year: Jason Taumalolo

Club
Paul Bowman Medal: Jason Taumalolo
Players' Player: Jason Taumalolo
Coach's Award: Kyle Feldt
Member's Player of the Year: Kyle Feldt
Club Person of the Year: Johnathan Thurston
Rookie of the Year: Jake Clifford
Townsville Bulletins' Fan Choice Award: Johnathan Thurston

Feeder Clubs

Queensland Cup
 Mackay Cutters - 14th, missed finals
 Northern Pride - 4th, lost elimination final
 Townsville Blackhawks - 3rd, lost elimination final

References

North Queensland Cowboys seasons
North Queensland Cowboys season